Vic and Sade was an American radio program created and written by Paul Rhymer. It was regularly broadcast on radio from 1932 to 1944, then intermittently until 1946, and was briefly adapted to television in 1949 and again in 1957.

During its 14-year run on radio, Vic and Sade became one of the most popular series of its kind, earning critical and popular success: according to Time, Vic and Sade had 7,000,000 devoted listeners in 1943. For the majority of its span on the air, Vic and Sade was heard in 15-minute episodes without a continuing storyline. The central characters, known as "radio's home folks", were accountant Victor Rodney Gook, his wife Sade (Bernardine Flynn) and their adopted son Rush (Bill Idelson). The three lived in "the little house halfway up in the next block."

Broadcast history

Vic and Sade was first heard over NBC's Blue network in 1932 and originated in Chicago.  At the height of its popularity, it was broadcast over all three major networks and as many as six times a day.

Overview

Vic and Sade was written by the prodigious Paul Rhymer for the entire length of its long run. The NBC radio series premiered on June 29, 1932 on its fifteen stations. The principal characters were a married couple living in "the small house halfway up in the next block". On July 8, 1932 Vic and Sade discussed the plight of 9-year-old Rush Meadows, who was the son of one of Sade's school friends. On July 15 Rush arrived, and soon listeners forgot that the boy had been adopted by the Gooks. It was in this format, with only three characters, that the program thrived for the next eight years and won many awards for the writer, actors and sponsor.

In 1940, the actor who played Vic, Art Van Harvey, became ill, and Sade's Uncle Fletcher (Clarence Hartzell) was added to the cast to fill the place of the missing male lead. When Van Harvey recovered his health, Uncle Fletcher was kept on as a fourth character. During World War II, the actor who played Rush, Bill Idelson, was called into military service, and he left the show. The spring months of 1943 were a tumultuous period, but eventually a second son figure, Russell Miller (David Whitehouse), was brought in, and the program continued as it always had. The show faltered somewhat with Whitehouse, who sounded as if he was reading his lines aloud in school. Idelson later returned as Rush.

Paul Rhymer frequently gave each of the principals a day off, by confining his scripts to only two of the main characters. Vic and Sade would discuss a domestic problem while Rush was in school; Sade and Rush would review the day's events while Vic was still at the office; Vic and Rush would tackle some project while Sade was out shopping. Several episodes deliberately make no forward progress whatever, as the cast introduces the episode's premise but gets bogged down in endless details. Rhymer evidently felt some pressure from the sponsor's advertising agencies to include more romance and human interaction in his scripts, like the other daytime dramas on the air. He complied by adding ridiculous touches (his romantic lead, Dwight Twentysixler, always speaks with his "mouth full of shingle nails"!) and oddball characters (Orville Wheeney, the slow-witted gas-meter man; Jimmy Custard, the crochety town official who never quite makes clear what he does as the City Calistrator with the statistics he collects; Mr. Sprawl, the frail old man who dotes on "peanuts with chocolate smeared on the outsides").

Vic and Sade went off the air September 29, 1944 but was brought back several times. In 1945, the cast was augmented to include many characters who were previously only talked about. In 1946 it was a summer replacement series, now in a half-hour format and played in front of a studio audience. Later that year it became a sustaining (unsponsored) feature on the Mutual network. In 1949 three television episodes were made (with only Flynn remaining from the original cast), using an elaborate set that included the whole house as well as the front and back yards; the three episodes replaced the Colgate Theatre anthology series, with the same company as sponsor. In 1957 a series entitled The Humor of Vic 'n' Sade ran for seven weeks, returning to the original three-character format with 15-minute episodes, a multi-camera setup and a small, stripped-down, bare set. Both Flynn and Van Harvey reprised their roles, with teen actor Eddie Gillian as Rush; the revival was cut short when Van Harvey died in July 1957.

Characters
All of the action of Vic and Sade, all of the people and all of the places in the town were created strictly through the dialogue. Listeners heard just the voices of the three, later four, principal speaking characters, embellished with very few sound effects. This effect is lost as the series progresses and more and more voices are added.

Speaking characters

Vic
 Victor Rodney Gook was the chief accountant of the Consolidated Kitchenware Company Plant Number Fourteen. He was the Exalted Big Dipper of the Drowsy Venus Chapter of the Sacred Stars of the Milky Way, a fraternal order founded by R.J. Konk. Vic's passion was parades, alarm clocks, cigars, wide-brimmed hats and doorbells. He was often asked to submit articles to the Kitchenware Dealers Quarterly and the lodge magazine. Rush's/Russell's nickname for Vic was "Gov." Vic's good deed was always looking out to help Hank Gutstop get a job, allowing Hank to pay Vic back (Sade thought little of Hank, a constant source of friction with Vic). Vic's opening line upon entering the house through the kitchen screen door was usually, "Hi-dee-hi, Ho-dee-ho," a borrowing from Cab Calloway's version of "Minnie the Moocher."

Sade
 Sade, the straightwoman of the cast, was a housewife who took pride in her housekeeping. Her interest outside the home was primarily focused on the Thimble Club sewing circle where she and the thimble ladies would get together to sew and gossip. She was very pragmatic about things and had little sense of humor. Her world extended to a very small radius and she cared little for anything outside her tightly drawn circle. Vic has addressed Sade as "Uncle Harry" and "Corporal Johnson," but his usual nickname for her was "Dr. Sleech" (he also called her "kiddo" quite a bit) and Rush/Russell just called her "Mom". Her unfulfilled goal was to go shopping with Ruthie and have each come out even in their money when they got home; it never balanced as she felt Vic and Rush would make fun of her money struggles.

Rush/Russell
Paul Rhymer had intended to introduce Rush by having Sade give birth to an 8-year-old boy, but the sponsor objected. On July 8, 1932 Vic and Sade discussed the plight of 9-year-old Rush Meadows, who was the son of one of Sade's school friends. On July 15th Rush arrived, and soon listeners forgot that the boy had been adopted by the Gooks. Rush's favorite activities were playing baseball (and football) in Tatman's vacant lot, watching the fat men play handball down at the YMCA, taking in the moving picture show at the Bijou Theatre (pronounced, "BY-JOE"), and reading about the adventures of Third Lieutenant Clinton Stanley. Rush and Russell had the same friends, but they differed in character: Rush was the schemer who was always looking for ways to make a quick buck and had an angle on everything; doing homework, and especially algebra, was not high on his priority list. Russell enjoyed and did well in school (but sometimes spoke with imperfect grammar) despite the fact he was more the dreamer, the naive young romantic; he was always willing to lend a hand no matter how impractical his outlook was; it follows then that chores around the house were not something he excelled at. Some scripts featuring Rush were recycled to feature Russell, such as "Working on Hank Gutstop's Debts", "Sleepers Beware", and "Mr. Chinbunny Wants to Smoke Cigars". However, "Rush Tenders His Resignations" involved Rush's scheme to make it well known among his school's faculty that he was resigning from clubs he had belonged to, ostensibly to focus on academics, in order that they would reward his new resolve with better grades; "Russell Tenders His Resignations" is less in character. Sade's usual nickname for Rush/Russell was "Willie" (based upon Bill Idleson's actual name?) and Vic might make a nickname out of another boy's name (e.g. "Roscoe"), a girl's name (e.g. "Margaret", or "Margorie"), or a compound noun (e.g. "Brain-Fog" or "Stove-Poker," with "White-House"used in "Christmas Suggestions for the Boss" on 26 November 1943being the actual surname of the actor portraying Russell).

Uncle Fletcher
 Uncle Fletcher was a talker who had an outrageous story and advice about everything. If there was one activity, outside of telling stories, that he can be noted for, it would be riding on Gumpox's garbage wagon, and he even got a special pass to allow him to do so. He would sometimes fall into the garbage. He especially enjoyed discussing the interesting facts and statistics about such things as his watch fob collection, key collection, photos and snapshots, and his landlady's washrag collection. And he liked popping popcorn. He was always bringing up names of people he assumed Sade knew, whom she never did. Uncle Fletcher liked to bring up the fellow who walked to his own funeral: "He made his plans, walked to the mortuary. There he later died." Uncle Fletcher would often address the family as "Vic/Sadie/Rush/Russell Honey," but once he denied Sade her "Honey" appellation because she had expressed impatience when he tried to relay some not-so-important news. He frequently told anecdotes about characters with names such as Rishigan Fishigan of Sishigan Michigan.

Non-speaking characters
The following characters were not portrayed by actors until very late in the show's run (and rarely even after that) but were frequently discussed by Vic, Sade, Rush and Uncle Fletcher.

 Bess, Walter, and "Yooncie"
 Sade's sister and her husband. Walter ran a barbershop in Carberry, Illinois, and Bess would send letters and postcards that always began "Dear sister and all, Thought I would write and see how you are feeling." Bess and Walter's daughter "Yooncie" (apparently a misreading of "Eunice," although Rush referred to his classmate Eunice Raypool correctly) was learning to play the piano; the pieces invariably found her stomping on the loud pedal with both feet and dragging her fingernail down the white or black keys. Walter always had twinges in his kneecap.

 Fred and Ruthie Stembottom
 ... enjoyed playing 500 (card game) with Vic and Sade. Ruthie would go with Sade to the washrag sales at Yamilton's Department Store, where she always ended up in the underwear department. Fred often tried to extort hard manual labor out of Vic (pour concrete floors, tear down partitions, change tires on the car) on the pretext of inviting him over to play cards, and serving Vic "buckets" of warm lemonade. They also serve as a means of transportation for Vic and Sade (who do not own a car), though before leaving, Fred must, inevitably, air up at least one tire. Uncle Fletcher developed the habit of calling Fred "Ted" (for no logical reason), others are influenced by this (including, it seems, Fred himself), and the name eventually sticks and Fred goes by Ted as the series progresses.

 Sade's other friends
 include, among others: Mis' Brighton, Mis' Trogel, and Mis' Appelrot.

 Vic's work associates
 Mr. Ruebush (his boss), Miss Hammersweet (his secretary), Gus Fuss (from Plant Number 17 in Dubuque, Iowa), Mr. Buller (in Chicago) and Lolita DiRienzi (in the boxing department – Sade was quite jealous!).

 Vic's lodge acquaintances
 His fellow-members of the All-star marching team: Y.Y. Flirch ( voted best looking man on east side of Lester, Neb), J.J.J.J. Stunbolt, Harry Fie, I. Edson Box, Homer U. McDancy, H.K. Fleeber (of Grovelman, South Carolina – also a Consolidated Kitchenware employee), Robert and Slobert Hink, O.X. Bellyman of Detroit and honorary member Pom-Pom Cordova.

 Rush's friends
 Smelly Clark, Blue-tooth Johnson ( whom Rush usually had " out by the garbage box"), Rooster and Rotten Davis, Leland Richards, Vernon Peggles, Milton Welch, LeRoy Snow, Heinie Call, Willis Roreback and Russell Duncan (not to be confused with Russell Miller). Nicer Scott was his deadly enemy. Mildred Tisdel, Eunice Raypole and Anabel Hemstreet were the girls in the neighborhood.

 Russell's friends
 Russell had most of the same friends as Rush with the addition of Oyster Crecker. His enemy was Heinie Call, although their relationship never reached the same feverish pitch as Rush and Nicer.

 Neighbors
 Mis' Harris, Mr. and Mis' Donahue (pronounced "Donahoo" by Sade and Rush/Russell), Charlie Razorscum, and Ike Kneesuffer (who played indoor horseshoes in his basement; also worked with Vic, always discussing the boxing dept at Plant 17 in Dubuque, Iowa on the phone). There was also Mis' Call, Mis' Fisher and Grandpa Snyder.

 Townsfolk
 Hank Gutstop (also in the Lodge as "Exalted Little Dipper," a peach of a fellow, known for sleeping 10 hours outside on the Illinois Central depot platform, fond of cigars), Stacey Yop, Alf Musherton, Pelter Unbleat, and B.B. Baugh. Mr. Gumpox was the garbage man. The Brick-mush man once got his head caught in a revolving door (at Yamilton's). Rishigan Fishigan from Sishigan, Michigan was introduced to the show as part of Mr. Buller's Christmas shopping list, but soon became a regular friend of Vic's (who would address him as "Fish" when they talked on the telephone); he was also the gentleman friend of Rush's Sunday School teacher Miss Neagel.

Setting
The town in which Vic and Sade live is named only once, in passing through a humorous credit in one episode ("Sade's gowns by Yamilton's Department Store – Crooper, Illinois"), over the course of the entire series, as far as it is known from existing scripts and recordings. In the June 20, 1940 episode, Rush says of his school's principal, "Mr. Chinbunny is attending a meeting of Illinois high school principals."  Therefore, their town must be in Illinois.  The town is based on a vaguely fictionalized version of Bloomington, Illinois, where Rhymer grew up. In fact, Bloomington is the county seat of McLean County, where Plant Number Fourteen is located.

Constant themes 
 Vic trying to buy "wide brimmed hat" or "cowboy hat"; Sade says it makes him look like a "peeled onion"
 Rush trying to borrow 10 cents from Vic
 Rush trying to finish a story about Smelly Clark's uncle's escorting his lady-friend to Peoria for purposes of enjoying a fish dinner
 Vic defending Hank Gutstop to Sade
 Sade comparing receipts coming out to an even dollar amount with Ruthie's totals on shopping trips
 Sade put upon having to buy Christmas cards in July 
 Vic handling Christmas gift list annually for boss
 Vic doing a spot of office work at the kitchen table
 Sade darning socks
 Sade bemoaning "those fellows from Chicago Lodge headquarters" always coming up with new ways to get money out of Vic
 Vic wanting to fix the alarm clocks – "they always need oiling & regulating" – with his little hammer, always breaking them
 Sade being jealous of the flirtatious Lolita DiRienzi
 Fred asking Sade what flavor ice cream to buy for the card party; Sade asking Vic (and, at least once, Rush); Sade disregarding Vic's suggestion and telling Fred that Vic is enthusiastic about chocolate-flavor (or, if the drugstore is out of that, strawberry-flavor) since chocolate (or strawberry) is Fred's favorite flavor

Venues frequently referenced

In town
The Bright Kentucky Hotel (which was shabby)
The Butler House Hotel (which was expensive: where Hank was fired as house detective for arresting guests)
The Ten Cent Store
The Greek's Confectionery
Croucher's Grocery Store (where Rush can buy bananas "if they're ripe")
Yamilton's Department Store (the place with washrag sales)
The Little Tiny Petite Pheasant Feather Tea Shoppy (which had only 3 tables; Hank was fired as hostess for excess eating)  
The Royal Throne Twenty-five-cent Barbershop (Hank quit on 1st day of job as business developer)
The People's Bank Building
The Unity Building (where Lodge meetings were held)
The Bijou Moving Picture Theater (usually featuring films starring Gloria Golden and Four-Fisted Frank Fuddleman)
Tatman's vacant lot (where Rush/Russell played baseball; at one time it was called Seymour's vacant lot)
Kleeberger's Haberdashery (who Vic perpetually owed $2)
Miller Park (which featured a zoo and a lake)
The Interurban Train Station
The Illinois Central Depot – where Hank Gutstop frequently sleeps on the platform
The courthouse – where Hank Gutstop frequently sleeps in the courtyard
The Lazy Hours Pool Parlor – where Hank Gutstop plays bottle pool

Communities oft mentioned
Sweet Esther, Wisconsin (town of the daily parade)
Grovelman, South Carolina (described as the geographical center of the United States by H.K. Fleeber)
East Brain, Oregon (home of Homer U. McDancy)
Yellow Jump, North Dakota
Sick River Junction, Missouri (home of the Missouri State Home for the Tall)
Fiendish, Indiana
Dismal Seepage, Ohio

As well, several actual Illinois communities near Bloomington were frequently referenced on air:
Stanford
Minier
Hopedale
Delavan
Hudson
Kappa
El Paso – not to mention these communities along Route 66 between Chicago and Bloomington:
Towanda
Lexington
Chenoa
Pontiac
Dwight

Influence
Once voted the best radio serial in a poll of 600 radio editors, Vic and Sade also received praise from many well-known listeners, including Ray Bradbury, Norman Corwin, Stan Freberg, Edgar A. Guest, Ogden Nash, John O'Hara, Fred Rogers, Franklin Delano Roosevelt, Jean Shepherd, James Thurber, Tom Lehrer and Hendrik Willem van Loon. Nash and O'Hara both compared Rhymer to Mark Twain, while others made a comparison with Charles Dickens, but Rhymer defies comparison since his work is basically a sui generis. The series had an influence on the writing of Kurt Vonnegut, who called it "the Muzak of my life."

Bernardine Flynn said the show once received a letter from a judge who called a recess each afternoon so he could listen to Vic and Sade.

Extant episodes
Despite such high praise, 2000 disc recordings of the show were destroyed just before 1940 and some 1200 have been lost since that time, including all episodes made before 1937. Today only about 330 original recordings have survived. (See #Audio downloads.) It is estimated that Rhymer wrote more than 3500 scripts for the show. Some of his scripts were collected in books (See #Bibliography).

Resources

Wisconsin Historical Society
Paul Rhymer's papers, including many Vic and Sade scripts and recordings, are held at the Wisconsin Historical Society.

Cast and credits

Principal cast

Other personnel
Announcers included Bob Brown (from 1932 to 1940), Ed Herlihy, Ed Roberts, Ralph Edwards, Mel Allen, the legendary New York Yankee broadcaster (went by Melvin) and Jack Fuller.

In addition to Rhymer himself, directors included Clarence Menser, Earl Ebi, Roy Winsor, Charles Rinehardt, Homer Heck, and Caldwell Cline.

The organist for the 15-minute version was Lou Webb.

References

Bibliography
 Books containing complete Vic and Sade scripts.
 Firestone, Ross. The Big Radio Comedy Program. New York: Contemporary Books, 1978. (Contains: "Mr. Dempsey and Mr. Tunney Meet in a Cigar Store")
 Rhymer, Paul, ed. by Mary Frances Rhymer, foreword by Ray Bradbury. The Small House Halfway Up in the Next Block: Paul Rhymer's Vic and Sade. New York: McGraw-Hill Book Company, 1972. (30 scripts)
 Rhymer, Paul. Vic and Sade: The Best Radio Plays of Paul Rhymer, foreword by Jean Shepherd. New York: Seabury Press, 1976. (30 scripts)
 Whipple, James. How to Write for Radio. New York: Whittlesey House, McGraw-Hill Book Company, 1938. (Contains "Sade Thinks Baseball is Just a Game")
 Wylie, Max ed. Best Broadcasts of 1940–41. New York: Whittlesey House, McGraw-Hill Book Company, 1942. (Contains "Mis' Keller's Birthday")

 Periodicals
 Thurber, James.  "Onward and upward with the arts: soapland", The New Yorker. Five-part series appearing on May 15, 1948 (pp. 34–44), May 29, 1948 (pp. 30–41), June 12, 1948 (pp. 46–53), July 3, 1948 (pp. 37–44) and July 24, 1948 (pp. 55–60).
 "Vic and Sade," Time, vol. 42,  December 27, 1943. (p. 42).
 Williamson, Albert R. "Vic and Sade's Creator" The Magazine of Sigma Chi. Volume 55, Number 3, July 1936. (pp. 109–111).

Discography
 LP records
 Paul Rhymer's Classic Vic & Sade Original Radio Broadcasts.  Producer, George Garabedian.  Writer, Paul Rhymer.  LP.  Annaheim: Mark56 Records, 1976.
 Son of Jest Like Old Times: More Genuine Original Recordings of Radio's Most Famous Funny Men.  LP.  New York: The Radiola Company, 1971.
 "Vic and Sade: Exactly as heard on Mutual on October 26, 1946."  The Spike Jones Show.  LP.  Sandy Cove, Conn* Radio Yesteryear – The Radiola Company, 1972.
 Vic and Sade: One Full Hour with Radio's Homefolks.  Writer, Paul Rhymer.  LP.  New York: Golden Age Records, 1978.

External links
Dick Judge's compilation of Vic and Sade opening lines
Max Schmid on Vic and Sade
Rick Schrage on Vic and Sade
Stephen M. Lawson on Vic and Sade
Vic and Sade.net
Part 1 of a student film based on an episode of Vic and Sade
Part 2 of a student film based on an episode of Vic and Sade
The Crazy World of Vic and Sade
Art Van Harvey.net
Video of a 1957 TV episode of Vic and Sade

Audio downloads

Internet Archive (surviving Vic and Sade episodes) 1 |  2 |  3 |  4 |  5 |
Interviews and 300+ episodes
Vic and Sade episode (6/30/41)
Vic and Sade mp3 downloads at jezner.com
The Crazy World of Vic and Sade (Sound-improved episodes)

American comedy radio programs
1932 radio programme debuts
1946 radio programme endings
Radio characters introduced in 1932
Radio duos
1930s American radio programs
1940s American radio programs
Chicago radio shows
Mutual Broadcasting System programs
NBC radio programs
NBC Blue Network radio programs
CBS Radio programs
United States National Recording Registry recordings